Rodrigo Garcia y Robertson (born 1949) is an American writer of historical and fantasy fiction. He holds a Ph.D in history and taught at UCLA and Villanova University before becoming a full-time writer. In addition to his eight novels, he has had numerous short stories published in fantasy and science fiction anthologies. He lives in Mount Vernon, Washington.

Bibliography

Novels
 The Spiral Dance (Avon Books, 1991) 
 American Woman (New York: Forge Books/Tom Doherty Associates, 1998) 
Firebird (New York: Tor Books/Tom Doherty Associates, 2006) 
Knight Errant series
 Knight Errant (New York: Forge Books/Tom Doherty Associates, 2001) 
 Lady Robyn (New York: Forge Books/Tom Doherty Associates, 2003) 
 White Rose (New York: Forge Books/Tom Doherty Associates, 2004) 
The Virgin and the Dinosaur series
 The Virgin and the Dinosaur (Avon Books, 1996) 
 Atlantis Found (Avon Books, 1997)

Short fiction
Collections
 The Moon Maid and Other Fantastic Adventures (Collinsville, Illinois: Golden Gryphon Press, 1998) 
Short stories

"Firebird" in In Lands That Never Were: Tales of Swords and Sorcery from the Magazine of Fantasy & Science Fiction, Gordon Van Gelder, editor (New York: Thunder's Mouth Press, 2004) 
 "Fair Verona" in Year's Best SF 3, David G. Hartwell, editor (New York: HarperPrism, 1998) 
 "Oxygen Rising" in Year's Best SF 11, David G. Hartwell and Kathryn Cramer, editors (New York: EOS/HarperCollins, 2006)

References

Dust jacket author information on Knight Errant.
Accumulated reviews for The Spiral Dance from District of Columbia public library, accessed April 23, 2010

External links

1949 births
Living people
20th-century American novelists
21st-century American novelists
American male novelists
People from Mount Vernon, Washington
The Magazine of Fantasy & Science Fiction people
20th-century American male writers
21st-century American male writers